The Men's 10,000 metres event at the 2013 European Athletics U23 Championships was held in Tampere, Finland, at Ratina Stadium on 11 July.

Medalists

Results

Final
11 July 2013 

Intermediate times:
1000m: 2:55.65 Marius Øyre Vedvik 
2000m: 5:57.21 Marius Øyre Vedvik 
3000m: 9:04.74 Marius Øyre Vedvik 
4000m: 12:06.21 Mats Lunders 
5000m: 15:02.01 Gabriel Navarro 
6000m: 18:08.61 Dmytro Siruk 
7000m: 21:11.84 Thijs Nijhuis 
8000m: 24:09.82 Igor Maksimov 
9000m: 27:04.37 Gabriel Navarro

Participation
According to an unofficial count, 20 athletes from 15 countries participated in the event.

References

10,000 metres
10,000 metres at the European Athletics U23 Championships